Rapper italiano is the fourth studio album by the Italian rapper Bassi Maestro, released in 2001 under Sano Business/Vibrarecords.

Track listing

Link 

2001 albums
Bassi Maestro albums